Kamran Qureshi (born 3 October 1975) is a filmmaker and television director/producer. He won Best Telefilm & Best Director Award for his first ever directed TV film Murad (a.k.a. Eunuch's Motherhood) with a cash prize in Indus Telefilm Festival.  He then won 7 awards for his first TV film series Maa Aur Mamta (a.k.a. Mother & Motherhood) same day in Indus Drama Awards. He was nominated for Best Director award in Lux Style Awards for his first drama serial Moorat (a.k.a. Eunuch's Wedding).

Career 
Qureshi started as Digital Video Effects Designer for TV channels and advertising agencies in 1992 and later he joined a television production house Telewise in 1995 as an Editor and Director. His journey into direction with branded programmes: Fanta Candid Camera, Allen Soothers Boom Bastic, Teleworld's Thrill Seekers, Cheer Up, Voyage of Discovery branded TV transmission sponsored by John Player Gold Leaf, Har Dam Tayyar on Military Forces by Embassy, and Ariel Mothers, sponsored by Procter and Gamble.

He made his first telefilm on Eunuchs Murad in 2003 which brought him first award for Best director and Best telefilm at Indus Telefilm Festival, then he made 12 more TV Films in a series and named it, "Maa Aur Mamta" (a.k.a. Mother & Motherhood) written by Zafar Mairaj. Later, continuing work on Eunuchs he directed his first drama serial "Moorat" (a.k.a. Eunuch's Wedding) in 2004 for 7th Sky Entertainment. Qureshi directed several branded TV shows, drama serials, documentaries and films.

Directorial credits
TV Serials
 Choti Si Kahani (Sunsilk and Fair & Lovely) - Brand endorsement TV serial
 Moorat a.k.a. Eunuch's Wedding
 Riyasat a.k.a. Kingdom of Hearts
 Manzil a.k.a. Her Lost Destination
 Makan a.k.a. Home a Heaven
 Sarkar Sahab a.k.a. Evicted Lord
 Ishq Ki Inteha Aka Unbounded Love
 Wafa

TV Shows
 Nestlé Nesvita Women of Strength - Educational Talk Show
 Nestlé Nido Young Stars a.k.a. Nido Ye Taarey Hamarey - Educational Talk Show
 Ariel Mothers a.k.a. Ariel Maa - Talk Show
 London Where I am for Barclays - Music Video
 John Player's Gold Leaf Cheer-up - Comedy Show
 John Player's Gold Leaf Thrill Seekers - Sports Show
 John Player's Gold Leaf Voyage of Discovery - TV Transmission
 Alan Soothers Boombastic - Music Charts
 Fanta Candid Camera - Comedy Show
 Coca-Cola Siachin Rocks Concert - Rock Concert
 Drama Hee Drama - Magazine Show
 Zee Basant Festival - Magazine Show
 Heart Talks - Film Based Show
 Zee Lollywood Show - Film Based Show
 Pepsi Top of the Pops - Music Charts
 Wall's Paddle Pop Kids Club - Kids Show

Films
 Beyond the Silence of the Sea
 John Player's Gold Leaf Food Street Concert
 Murad
 Sons of Soil
 Power of the Sea
 Meharun Nisa
 Flying Tigers
 Lost Half a.k.a. Mannat
 Impeccable a.k.a. Masoom
 A Rented Child a.k.a. Mazloom
 Lap of Actress a.k.a. Muskaan
 An Insane Laugh a.k.a. Mehak
 Sentenced for Love a.k.a. Mujrim
 Sold Unborn a.k.a. Mahram
 Mary's Sacrifice a.k.a. Marium
 Unwanted Daughter a.k.a. Madawa
 Mother of Desert a.k.a. Muhafiz
 Way to Hope a.k.a. Mahinder Singh
 No. 9
 Special Drink
 Those 70 days
 Pianist Reborn
 His Promise
 An Act of Loyalty
 Waiting

Productions
TV Shows
 Ariel Mothers a.k.a. Ariel Maa
 Zee Basant Festival
 Zee Lollywood Show

Films
 Mahnoor
 Woman's Freedom
 Victim of an Honour Killing
 Verdict of a Pashtun Court
 Survival of a Woman
 I'm Locked
 Hometown Memories
 Help of a Ghost
 Gambled Daughter
 Dually Wed
 Drama Fever
 Dowry List
 Cactus's Flower
 Alive to See Her
 An Act of Loyalty
 Waiting

Awards and nominations 
 Winner: Best Talk Show Award from private production for Ariel Mothers (Ariel Maa) in 2002 PTV Awards.

References

External links
  
 Kamran Qureshi's Official website

Living people
British film directors
1975 births
Alumni of the National Film and Television School
Alumni of the London Film School
British television directors